Caesius, bluish-gray in Latin, may refer to:
 Caesius, the nomen of a prominent Roman family
Philippus Caesius, latinized name of Philipp von Zesen, a 17th-century Dutch writer